Copelatus collarti is a species of diving beetle. It is part of the genus Copelatus of the subfamily Copelatinae in the family Dytiscidae. It was described by Regimbart in 1895.

References

crassus
Beetles described in 1895